Alvesia is a genus of plants in the family Lamiaceae, first described in 1869. It is native to central Africa.

Species
 Alvesia clerodendroides (T.C.E.Fr.) B.Mathew - Burundi, Tanzania
 Alvesia cylindricalyx (B.Mathew) B.Mathew - Zaïre, Zambia
 Alvesia rosmarinifolia Welw. - Congo-Brazzaville, Zaïre, Zambia Angola

References

Lamiaceae
Lamiaceae genera